Borislav Iliev (born 18 February 1988) is a Bulgarian retired footballer who played as a defender. He had played for Dunav Ruse.

References

External links
 
 

1988 births
Living people
Bulgarian footballers
First Professional Football League (Bulgaria) players
FC Dunav Ruse players
FC Sportist Svoge players
Association football defenders